Warkany syndrome 1 was an X-chromosome linked recessive genetic condition originally described by Joseph Warkany in 1961 as part of an article on intrauterine growth retardation - the condition is no longer diagnosed. The family history was consistent with X-linked recessive inheritance of intrauterine growth retardation and small head size, but these features are not unique to this condition and no linkage to a specific gene was ever established.  In fact, the condition appears to have been abandoned, given that the OMIM number (308400) assigned to it and listed in a review article on X-linked mental retardation has been removed from the OMIM database. Furthermore, this condition is no longer mentioned in a more recent review of X-linked mental retardation.

See also
 Trisomy 8, which causes Warkany syndrome 2

References

External links
U.S. National Library of Medicine: Warkany Syndrome 1

Syndromes
Rare diseases